Halosaurus ovenii, also called the Oven's halosaur, is a  deep-sea fish in the family Halosauridae. It is found in the eastern Atlantic where it is widely distributed in tropical and subtropical waters along both coasts. In the Mediterranean, H. ovenii is considered rare. It can reach up to 60 cm in length.

References

Halosauridae
Fish described in 1864
Taxa named by James Yate Johnson